Horstrissea is a monotypic genus of flowering plant in the family Apiaceae. Its only species is Horstrissea dolinicola. The genus and species were first described in 1990. It is threatened by habitat loss.

References

Flora of Crete
Critically endangered plants
Monotypic Apiaceae genera
Taxonomy articles created by Polbot
Apiaceae